The 2022 Acura Grand Prix of Long Beach was the third round of the 2022 IndyCar season. The race was held on April 10, 2022, in Long Beach, California on the Streets of Long Beach. The race lasted for 85 laps.

Entry list

Practice

Practice 1
Jimmie Johnson crashed out of turn 6 during this practice session causing an injury to his hand.

Practice 2

Qualifying

Qualifying classification 
Rookie Devlin DeFrancesco took a six place grid penalty for avoidable contact from the previous race.

 Notes
 Bold text indicates fastest time set in session.

Warmup

Race 
The race started at 3:30 PM ET on April 10, 2022.

Race classification

Championship standings after the race 

Drivers' Championship standings

Engine manufacturer standings

 Note: Only the top five positions are included.

References

External links 

Grand Prix of Long Beach
Acura Grand Prix of Long Beach
Acura Grand Prix of Long Beach
Acura Grand Prix of Long Beach